Maryknoll High School of Lambajon, also known as Maryknoll La Salle, is a De La Salle-supervised school located in Baganga, Davao Oriental, Philippines.

References

External links
Lasallian Schools in the Philippines
CBCP Online
Diocesan Directory

Schools in Davao Oriental
Catholic elementary schools in the Philippines